State Route 505 (SR 505) is a north–south highway in the southwestern quadrant of the U.S. state of Ohio.

Route description
All of SR 505 is situated within the southwestern corner of Brown County.  This route is not included as a part of the National Highway System, a network of highways identified as being most important for the country's economy, mobility and defense.

History
The SR 505 designation was assigned in 1937. For the duration of its history, SR 505 has maintained the same routing between US 52 in Higginsport and SR 125 near Hamersville.

In 1940, when SR 756 was extended east from Felicity to connect to SR 505 at the point that marks its current eastern terminus.  At that time, however, SR 756 was extended northeast to run concurrently with SR 505 to a common terminus at SR 125. This would remain the case until 1995, when the SR 756 concurrency was removed from SR 505, resulting in SR 756 having a new eastern terminus where it currently does at SR 505.  In addition, SR 505 was re-instated to its 1937–1940 status of being free of a concurrency for its entire length.

Major intersections

References

505
Transportation in Brown County, Ohio